FC BFV is a Malagasy football club based in Antananarivo, Madagascar. The team has won the THB Champions League in 1996, qualifying them for the 1997 CAF Champions League.

The team currently plays in the Malagasy Second Division.

Achievements
THB Champions League: 1
1996

Performance in CAF competitions
CAF Champions League: 1 appearance
1997 CAF Champions League - first round

References

External links

BFV
Antananarivo